In the Great Britain road numbering scheme, the country is divided into numbered zones, the boundaries of which are usually defined by single-digit roads.  The first digit of a road's number should be the number of the zone it occupies.  If the road occupies multiple zones, then the furthest-anticlockwise zone is the correct one. The following tables list all British roads which are anomalously numbered.  Roads in bold lie completely outside their "correct" zone; all other roads run for some length in their "correct" zones but trespass into zones anticlockwise of this zone.  A further table lists duplicated road numbers.

Motorways
The motorway zone boundaries are different from the A-road boundaries.

While the M25 may appear to contradict these rules as it runs through all the London-bound zones, it in fact does not; it does not run in a complete circle, starting in Zone 2, and proceeding clockwise through zones 3, 4 and 1. The A282, which completes the circle mostly formed by the M25, is anomalously numbered; as it proceeds into the A-road 1-zone (and should therefore begin with a 1).
The M271 is numbered as a spur of the M27, as opposed to the traditional numbering rules, however the M3 to Southampton came after the M271 was built and is not the zone boundary, which appears to be a straight line from M3 J8 to Exeter in some documentation.

A roads

B roads

Irregularities not based on the zoning system

Two clearly separate roads with the same number

References

 Out-of-Zone Roads (from which most of the information on this page is taken)
 The SABRE Wiki A comprehensive database of numbered roads in Great Britain and Ireland
 UK Roads - Numbering Quirks Lists of duplicated road numbers, out-of-zone roads and more

External links 
Oddities and anomalies – Chris Marshall, archived in 2015

Lists of roads in the United Kingdom